Zacorisca sibyllina is a species of moth of the family Tortricidae. It is found on New Guinea.

The wingspan is about 18 mm. The forewings are silvery white with a black costal edge and some pale yellowish suffusion towards the apex. The hindwings are dark grey, darker towards the apex.

References

	

Moths described in 1910
Zacorisca